Yana Nariezhna (born 29 August 1999) is a Ukrainian synchronised swimmer. She is World Championships medalist.

Career
Nariezhna won three bronze medals at the inaugural European Games where she was third in duet, team and combination competitions.

At the 2017 World Aquatics Championships Nariezhna won silver in the combination event.

References

1999 births
Living people
Ukrainian synchronized swimmers
World Aquatics Championships medalists in synchronised swimming
Synchronized swimmers at the 2017 World Aquatics Championships
Artistic swimmers at the 2019 World Aquatics Championships
European Aquatics Championships medalists in synchronised swimming
European Championships (multi-sport event) silver medalists
European Games medalists in synchronised swimming
European Games bronze medalists for Ukraine
Synchronised swimmers at the 2015 European Games
Sportspeople from Kharkiv
21st-century Ukrainian women